Otakuthon is Quebec's largest anime convention promoting Japanese animation (anime), Japanese graphic novels (manga), related gaming and Japanese pop-culture (music, cinema, television). It is held annually for 3 days in downtown Montreal during a weekend in August. It is a non-profit, fan-run anime convention that was initiated by Concordia University's anime club, named Otaku Anime of Concordia University (Otaku Anime for short). The name "Otakuthon" is a portmanteau of the Japanese word "otaku" and "marathon". Otakuthon strives to be a bilingual (French and English) event, having programming, the masquerade and the program book in both official languages. The first edition of Otakuthon was held in 2006 in mid-June, but later moved to early-mid August / late July from 2007 onward. Last year's edition, Otakuthon 2019, was held on August 16–18, 2019 at the Palais des congrès de Montréal.

Programming
As with most other anime conventions, Otakuthon offers a wide range of programming, exhibits, and other events. Otakuthon's programming consists of cosplay events, a masquerade, vendors, an Artists' Area, panels and workshops, game shows, anime video screenings, dances, karaoke and music concerts. New to 2008 were photo booths, a garage sale and a manga library.

Art: The Artists' Area is an artists' marketplace for illustrators, painters, writers, and crafters to display and sell their arts and crafts. A separate Art Gallery allows artists to display and auction their artworks.
Cosplay events: Otakuthon features a Cosplay Skit Contest called the Otaku Skit Show, a Masquerade, a Cosplay Chess and a Cosplay RPG Battle. Many attendees spend most of the convention in costume as their favorite anime, manga or video game character. Some participate in the Otaku Skit Show, the Masquerade (one of Otakuthon's largest events), the Cosplay Chess and the Cosplay RPG. There are also photo booths where attendees can have their photos professionally taken in costume, and the Cosplay Café, where attendees can enjoy Japanese snacks, meals, desserts and drinks while being served by volunteers in cosplay. New in 2014 was the Canadian Preliminaries for the World Cosplay Summit, where cosplayers from Canada compete and qualify to represent the country at this international cosplay event in Japan (see History section).
Gaming: Otakuthon has a large room for playing video games on consoles and PCs, with tournaments scheduled throughout the weekend. It has also tables reserved for tabletop card-trading games such as Magic: The Gathering and boardgames such as Settlers of Catan.
Merchandise: The convention has a large Dealers' Area in which commercial merchants such retailers and professional artists and crafters set up booths and sell anime, manga and video game related merchandise. It is one of the main attractions of the convention. There is also a garage sale section where attendees can buy used merchandise items.
Music: There are musical performances throughout the weekend. There is at least one concert at the convention featuring a musical Guest. Otakuthon also features karaoke rooms and hosts the Otakuthon Idol singing contest and the J-Music in Motion show.
Panels and workshops: Otakuthon, like almost every convention, has panels and workshops on subjects such as various anime series, how to draw manga, voice acting, Japanese culture and a variety of other topics. While Guests of Honour discuss and tell news or stories about their roles or occupations and answer questions from the audience, most panels and workshops are given by fans rather than Guests.
Saturday Night Dance: There is a late-night dance party on Saturday night hosted by Montreal area (and sometimes Guest) anime DJs.
Video screenings: There are many rooms in which anime series, films and OVAs and live action J-Dramas are shown on projector screens during the convention. Fan-made productions such as fan parodies and anime music videos (AMVs) are also shown. For those who prefer reading manga, there is a room where the entire manga library collection of Otaku Anime is at the disposal of attendees to borrow and read.
Sub-events: Each year, Otakuthon has hosted a number of sub-events, a series of programming and activities based around specific passions. To date, this has included Yaoithon, Yurithon, Dollfest, the Hakurei Shrine Festival, and Pokéthon.
Other attractions: Attendees can meet Guests and get items autographed, or engage in the weekend-long anime-themed Otakuthon Misadventures live-action role-playing (LARP) game with dozens of participants. There are also various other games, events, shows and contests such as the Opening and Closing Ceremonies, the Fashion Show, the Sunday Morning Brunch, Trollball, Otakuthon Turnabout, the Anime Mystery Dating Game, Anime Name That Tune, Anime Win, Lose, or Draw, the Human Battleship Game, Yurika Kart, and DollFest activities.

History

Otakuthon evolved from the annual Animethon anime marathon presented by Otaku Anime of Concordia University, held at the Henry F. Hall Building on the Sir George Williams campus. The anime marathon had over the years, used one or several screening rooms, over the course of one or two days, and had included ancillary events. In 2005, the 10th edition of Animethon was renamed Otakuthon. In 2006, Otaku Anime joined with other local anime clubs and individuals to turn the annual anime marathon into a full blown convention.

While convention membership at the 2006 edition was free, admission fees were introduced from 2007 and onwards. There was a pre-registration option for the paid memberships, and attendees who pre-registered could arrive on Friday afternoon to receive their membership badges in order to gain instant access to all convention events on the same day at opening time. Admissions for the Masquerade and J-pop concert were included in the membership fee.

The 2007 edition's outstanding success prompted Otakuthon to move its venue from Concordia University to the much larger Palais des congrès de Montréal convention center in summer 2008. This allowed the convention to increase its capacity, concentrate the main attractions on a single floor instead of multiple floors at the university, as well as free itself from restrictions imposed upon by the institution. In the same year, Otaku Anime and the other anime clubs managing the convention formed the Quebec Anime Committee, Otakuthon's parent organization.

With a great number of out-of-province Guests invited in 2009, Otakuthon was upgraded from a regional-level convention to a national-level one. 2010 introduced a Thursday evening badge pickup option for pre-registered attendees, which alleviated the long lineups on Friday as well as provided them immediate access to the convention area when the doors opened on Friday afternoon. Year after year, Otakuthon has occupied more and more conference spaces and hallways of the convention center following an annual progressive growth; while in 2008 less than half of the 5th and 7th floors were booked, in 2010 nearly 80% of those floors plus the main exhibition hall of the 2nd floor (for Registration) were open for the convention. In 2017, Registration was moved to Level 1 to make space for expansion of the Exhibition Hall on the 2nd floor. Expansion of exhibit and conference space is expected to continue in the upcoming years as the convention continues to maintain a strong growth rate. In 2014, the Quebec Anime Committee became the Otakuthon Cultural Society and continues to manage the convention to this day.

In 2018, Otakuthon started offering VIP passes called Premium Badges. A badge mailout option was also introduced to attendees pre-registering for the convention.

Otakuthon has a relatively significant economic impact on Montreal, compared to other similar-sized national-level conventions held at the same location. In 2011, the convention generated an estimated $2,137,157 in economic spinoffs in the city, while in 2010 it generated an estimated $1,606,076.

In 2020, Otakuthon was cancelled for the first time due to concerns over the ongoing COVID-19 pandemic.

World Cosplay Summit Canadian Preliminaries

In 2014, the World Cosplay Summit (WCS) announced that Canada would join this international event as an Observer Nation in 2015. Otakuthon was selected as the convention to hold the Canadian Preliminaries for the WCS, starting in 2014. Winners from the Preliminaries at Otakuthon 2014 traveled to Japan to participate in the WCS 2015 events, but not compete in the Cosplay Championship. This was the first time a Canadian cosplay delegation represented the country at this international event, which has been running yearly since 2003.

Since 2016, Canada was eligible to compete in the Championship and earn awards. The Preliminaries to select the team to represent Canada as a full-participating nation were held at Otakuthon 2015, almost a full year in advance. The World Cosplay Summit is generally held from late July to early August, with the 2016 edition held from Sat, Jul 30, 2016 to Sun, Aug 7, 2016. In 2017, the Preliminaries at Otakuthon were moved from Friday evening to Sunday mid-day, and the show was livestreamed to Team Canada's quarters in Nagoya; also that year, the Cosplay Championship was livestreamed to Otakuthon attendees in a special screening room.

Event history

Sub-events
Year after year, Otakuthon hosts a number of sub-events, a series of programming and activities based around specific passions.

Yaoithon: A celebration of all things yaoi, including shounen-ai, slash-related phenomena and related fandom and communities, with events such as panels, screenings and workshops.
Yurithon: A celebration of all things yuri, including shoujo-ai and femmeslash, with events such as panels and screenings.
Dollfest: A celebration of both ball jointed dolls and Asian dolls. Events include panels, workshops, a doll masquerade and swap meet.
Hakurei Shrine Festival: Also known as TouhouFest, this sub-event celebrates the Touhou Project video games. Hakurei Shrine Festival first began in 2013 and has included panels, cosplay meet-ups, screenings, video game tournaments, and art and merchandise swaps.
Pokéthon: A Pokémon-themed sub-event that took place in 2014 and 2016. Pokéthon was the first series of Pokémon-themed fan-run events in Canada, and included panels, a video game tournament, card game tournament, trivia contest and cosplay photo-shoot. They also helped launch the Montreal Pokémon League.

Other events

Otakuthon's staff and volunteers also organize events in Montreal other than the main annual convention. Most of the con's staff and volunteers are present at these events.

Since 2008, Otakuthon has held an annual Halloween Party on the Saturday before Halloween. It is Montreal's second-largest cosplay event after Otakuthon, ahead of Montreal Comiccon, and second-largest costumers' gathering on Halloween after La Grande Mascarade. The Otakuthon Halloween Party has changed venue every year in order to accommodate for increasing attendance.
Otakuthon Halloween Party 2008 was held at the Coeur des Sciences building of the UQAM.
The 2009 Party was held at the Chinatown Holiday Inn Select hotel. The event sold out, resulting in attendees being turned away at the entrance, with some of them coming from afar. As people left, new tickets were sold, and some of those who were turned away came back and were admitted to the party. This prompted the organizers to find a much larger venue for next year's Halloween Party.
The 2010 Party was held at L'Espace Réunion reception hall, a much larger venue than 2009's location. New features included skill games and a food service area.
The 2011 Party was held at Outremont's Inter-Generational Community Center. It featured more skilled games and a larger food service area. However, no photo booth was installed.
The 2012 Party was held again at the same Outremont Community Center, with minor changes and additions. A Halloween-themed wide painted backdrop was available for open photoshoots.
In 2013, the Party moved to the larger Centre Jean-Claude Malépart and had minor changes and additions.
The same venue was used for the 2014 Party.
There was no 2015 Party, as the convention was unable to secure a venue that meets the scheduling, budgetary and logistical requirements involved in running an Otakuthon Halloween Party.
In February 2012, Otakuthon hosted a Manga Ball. Held at the Grande Bibliothèque of the Bibliothèque et Archives nationales du Québec, this ballroom-type dance event coincided with Montreal's Nuit Blanche downtown-wide event.

Additionally, they organize an annual trip  each May to Anime North (AN) in Toronto, Canada's largest anime convention. The travel group is open to anyone, not just Otakuthon attendees. The Otakuthon staff and volunteers assigned to this trip, which act as brokers, receive trip signups and trip money from travelers, which is used to reserve chartered buses, book hotel rooms and make group registrations for the con. This travel group from Montreal is the largest, single group registration for Anime North, at about 50 people. Otakuthon's annual Anime North trip provides a cost-effective, centrally-managed opportunity for Montrealers to attend AN without the hassle of figuring out every detail of the trip, competing for hotel room bookings, getting together a group large enough to qualify for Anime North's group rate, and determining an itinerary from Montreal to the con's area, which is outside of downtown Toronto, requiring commuting or a taxi ride if the method of transport chosen is by bus or train, which have their terminals downtown. (Car travelers can drive directly to the con, while air travelers can land at Toronto Pearson International Airport, which is next to the con.) Signups for the trip usually open in January of each year.

Mascot

Yurika (pictured on the right), a fictional blue-haired teenage girl, serves as Otakuthon's mascot. She appears under many forms on Otakuthon booklets, badges, website, clothing and other wearables. She was originally created for the convention by local artist Jessie Rong. Yurika has been drawn by various artists over the years and a mascot contest was even once held. Véronique Thibault, Yinyin Liu, Sharyl Chow and Meryem Bahnini were credited in the Otakuthon 2010 program booklet for different versions of the mascot. In 2011, Yurika was joined by her brother Yatsumi, her cousin Yuki, and her friend Yumi.

Past anime conventions in Montreal
There has been 2 other anime conventions held in Montreal, in addition to Otakuthon. They were:

Montreal Anime Expo, Montreal's first anime convention. Organized by Hobby Star Marketing (HSM) of Toronto, it was held on November 14–16, 2003 at the Palais des congrès de Montréal. The Guests of Honor were Scott McNeil, Kirby Morrow, Chris Sabat and Brad Swaile. Montreal Anime Expo never returned, and Montreal had no anime convention between 2003 and 2006.
Daikon, a single-day anime convention held on July 3, 2010, at the Holiday Inn Montreal Midtown. Their Guest of Honor was Linda Hartley, and a portion of the proceeds went to the Montreal Children's Hospital Foundation. This convention also never returned.

See also
Montreal Comiccon, Montreal's comic book convention
Anime North, Canada's largest anime convention

References

External links
 
 
 Otakuthon on Flickr
 
 Otaku Anime of Concordia University

News articles:
Montreal Gazette review of Otakuthon 2008
Otakuthon 2008 Cosplay at Montreal Gazette
Article in Le Devoir
Article in the Montreal Gazette

Anime conventions in Canada
Festivals in Montreal
Comics conventions in Canada
Summer events in Canada
Arts festivals in Quebec